Angove Conservation Park is a protected area located about  north-east of the Adelaide city centre within the local government area of the City of Tea Tree Gully.  The conservation park was proclaimed under the National Parks and Wildlife Act 1972 in 1994 in order to protect a parcel of undeveloped land which contained remnant native vegetation.  The conservation park is classified as an IUCN Category III protected area.

See also
 List of protected areas in Adelaide

References

External links
Angove Conservation Park official webpage
Angove Conservation Park webpage on protected planet

Conservation parks of South Australia
Protected areas in Adelaide
Protected areas established in 1994
1994 establishments in Australia